24/7 Comedy was a 24-hour live, commercial-free radio format produced by iHeartMedia's Premiere Networks in the United States and by Bell Media in Canada.It showcased the stand-up comedy routines of established and emerging comedians in a rapid-fire presentation style and was programmed by an array of comedians and comedy experts. The network targeted a 18-54 demographic range. It remains available through the iHeartRadio app in a more automated form, and in Canada through IHeart's Bell Media-managed presences.

It was first conceived in April 2008 by Bill Bungeroth, who had his partner George Gimarc design the format. 24/7 Comedy's debut on air was September 27, 2010 in Riverside, California, on KFNY, and a few weeks later digitally on iHeartRadio on October 22, 2010. Bungeroth's company was purchased by what was then Clear Channel in July 2012.

Short and fast-paced comedic bits are broadcast all day and night, averaging two to four minutes, like music formats. A different comedian would appear weekly as a guest host, often with on the road stories about their routines and featuring their favorite fellow comedians.

Clear Channel started phasing out the format from its stations in early 2014, with it discontinuing over-the-air on August 3, 2014. Non-iHeart-owned stations then transitioned to another network known as "Today's Comedy," which launched concurrently with 24/7 Comedy's closure.

Astral Media introduced the network on its AM stations in Hamilton and London, Ontario in 2012It is a rarity among Canadian radio networks in that the programming originates almost entirely from outside Canada — the longstanding Canadian content requirements do not apply to spoken-word programming (however, the stations still provide local inserts, and also air the locally produced Humble & Fred as a late night program).

Former Affiliate(s)

United States

Notes:
¹ Indicates a Daytimer radio station.

Canada

Notes:
² Indicates a shortwave station, repeating CKMX Calgary.

References

External links
 24/7 Comedy Radio - official site

IHeartMedia
Defunct radio networks in the United States
American radio comedy
Radio stations established in 2010 
Radio stations disestablished in 2014
Defunct radio stations in the United States